Virginia Orr Maes (1920–1986) was an American malacologist associated with the Academy of Natural Sciences of Philadelphia. Thanks to her collecting, the Academy has an exceptionally fine collection of turrids. She married Robert A. Maes in 1963. They had no children.

A bibliography of Virginia Orr Maes was written by the malacologist Robert Robertson in 1987.

Taxa named in honor 
Gastropods named in honor of Virginia Orr Maes include one genus, six species and one subspecies:
 Genus Maesiella McLean in McLean & Poorman, 1971
 Anarithma maesi Drivas & Jay, 1986
 Fusiturricula maesae Rios, 1985
 Maesiella maesae McLean & Poorman, 1971
 Pugnus maesae Roth, 1972
 Simnia maesae Cate, 1973
 Taheitia orrae Turner, 1959
 Subspecies Strombus urceus orrae Abbott, 1960 - now considered to be a synonym of Canarium urceus urceus (Linnaeus, 1758)

References 

American malacologists
1920 births
1986 deaths
20th-century American zoologists